Andrew Pollard may refer to:

 Andrew Pollard (educator) (born 1949), British educator
 Andrew Pollard (immunologist) (born 1965), British immunologist